Roger Federer's 2010 season was punctuated by his victory at the Australian Open, beating Andy Murray in the final. Federer played in 18 tournaments in 2010 and won five. He was runner-up in the Mutua Madrileña Madrid Open to Rafael Nadal. At the French Open, he faced his opponent in the previous year's final, Robin Söderling, at the quarterfinals stage and lost. As defending champion at Wimbledon, he was defeated in the quarterfinals by Tomáš Berdych in four sets, thus ending his streak of seven consecutive Wimbledon finals and also falling to world No. 3, his lowest ranking since 2003. During the summer hard-court season, Federer hired Paul Annacone to be his coach and revive his form. At the 2010 US Open, Federer advanced to his seventh straight semifinal appearance, but lost to Novak Djokovic in five sets, despite holding two match points in the final set. Federer's ranking slipped back from No. 2 to No. 3 after the tournament, but he finished the year strong with victories in Stockholm, Basel, and the ATP Tour Finals to pass Djokovic in the rankings and finish the year at world No. 2. By the end of 2010, Federer had earned wide consideration as the greatest male tennis player of all time.

Year summary

Early hard court season and Australian Open
On Sunday, January 17, Federer created a charity tournament called the "Hit for Haiti" at the Rod Laver Arena the day before the Australian Open. He invited a number of top world players from the ATP and WTA tours to join him to raise money for relief efforts in Haiti. The players who participated included Federer, Rafael Nadal, Andy Roddick, Novak Djokovic, Kim Clijsters, Serena Williams, Lleyton Hewitt, and Samantha Stosur. A few days before the start of Indian Wells, Federer, Nadal, 14-time Grand Slam singles champion Pete Sampras, and 8-time Grand Slam singles champion Agassi participated in a doubles exhibition match called "Hit for Haiti 2" as a fundraiser for the relief efforts in Haiti. Also in February, Federer made a trip to  Ethiopia, where his charity foundation works.

Federer started the year by playing in the Qatar ExxonMobil Open in Doha, where he was defeated in the semifinals by eventual champion Nikolay Davydenko.

Federer won his 16th Grand Slam singles title at the Australian Open. In the fourth round, Federer beat Lleyton Hewitt in straight sets. In the quarterfinals, Federer trailed Davydenko by a set and two games in the second set, but was able to win in four sets. Federer then defeated world no. 10 and 2008 Australian Open runner-up Jo-Wilfried Tsonga in the semifinals in straight sets. This marked the 23rd consecutive time that Federer had appeared in a semifinal of a Grand Slam tournament, and the seventh consecutive year that Federer had made at least the semifinals at the Australian Open, breaking the previous record held by Ivan Lendl. In the final, Federer defeated fifth-seeded Andy Murray in straight sets to claim his fourth Australian Open singles title. This win tied him for most Australian Open victories in the open era at four with Andre Agassi. Since Wimbledon 2005 Federer had made the finals of 18 out of 19 Grand Slam tournaments, an extraordinary period of sustained excellence unparalleled in the Open Era.

Federer withdrew from the Barclays Dubai Tennis Championships for the second consecutive year due to a lung infection.

Federer then appeared at the BNP Paribas Open in Indian Wells for his first tournament since the Australian Open. Along with the 31 seeded players behind him, Federer received a first round bye in the main draw. However, in the third round, he was defeated by Marcos Baghdatis in a rematch of the 2006 Australian Open final, after Federer failed to convert three match points.

The week after Indian Wells, Federer played in the Sony Ericsson Open in Miami. Federer and the other 31 seeded players received first-round byes. In the second round, Federer defeated Nicolás Lapentti before over 14,000 fans, a record-breaking attendance for a second round match in the Stadium (the center court of Miami). After beating Florent Serra, Federer lost to the eventual runner-up, Czech Tomáš Berdych, in three sets in the fourth round. Federer hit 62 unforced errors in that match.

Clay court season and French Open
Federer next appeared in the Internazionali BNL d'Italia in Rome. In addition to singles, he teamed with Yves Allegro for the doubles competition as wildcards. The team lost in the quarterfinals to Sam Querrey and John Isner. Federer lost to world no. 40 Gulbis in the second round of the singles competition, after receiving a first-round bye. It was the first time since 2000 that Federer had lost his opening clay-court match of the year. It was the first time since 2002 that he had lost before the quarterfinals at three consecutive events, and the first time since 2002 that he had lost his first match in Rome.

Federer then played the Estoril Open. In his only previous appearance in 2008, he won the title, when Davydenko retired in the final. However, he lost in the semifinals this year to Albert Montañés in straight sets, after which Federer said he was not worried by his current form, while Nadal expressed surprise at his rival's loss.

Federer continued at the Mutua Madrileña Madrid Open, where he was the defending champion. He defeated his 2008 Olympic doubles partner Stanislas Wawrinka in the third round. In the quarterfinals, he avenged his earlier loss to Gulbis. In the semifinals, he defeated David Ferrer in three sets. Federer then lost to Nadal in the final in straight sets.

In the third round of the French Open, Federer beat Julian Reister to register his 700th ATP-level match victory and 150th on clay. He followed this milestone by defeating Wawrinka in the fourth round. Federer lost in the quarterfinals to Robin Söderling, ending his six-year streak of consecutive Grand Slam semifinals. Moreover, after the end of tournament, he lost the world no. 1 ranking to Nadal, leaving Federer at 285 weeks of being world no. 1, with Sampras holding the record of 286 weeks at that time.

Grass court season and Wimbledon
Federer next played at the Gerry Weber Open, where he lost to Hewitt in the final in three sets. In doubles, Federer and Allegro lost in the first round to Christopher Kas and Philipp Kohlschreiber.

Next, Federer attempted to defend his title at the Wimbledon Championships. Since Wimbledon has a different formula for seedings based on grass-court achievements, Federer was seeded first above world no. 1 Rafael Nadal. In the first round, Federer won for the 200th occasion in Grand Slam matches as he came from two sets down to beat Alejandro Falla, who served for the match in the fourth set at that time, but Falla took Federer to another set before Federer won in a quick fifth set. Federer beat Ilija Bozoljac in four sets. He next faced Arnaud Clément and had a straight-set victory. In the fourth round, Federer defeated no. 16 seed Jürgen Melzer. In the quarterfinals, he faced Tomáš Berdych, but lost in four sets. With this defeat, Federer became ranked no. 3 at the end of Wimbledon, which was his lowest ranking since November 10, 2003.

US Open Series and US Open
During Federer's summer break between Wimbledon and Canada, he hired Pete Sampras' old coach Paul Annacone to attempt to revive his fortune, to start with on a trial period.  After beating Chela in his first match at the 2010 Rogers Cup, Federer broke Andre Agassi's record for Master level wins as he won his 210th match. Federer then overcame quarterfinal and semifinal challenges from Berdych and Djokovic respectively, winning the first set of both matches before dropping the second and having to fight hard to capture the decider. His triumph over Djokovic, the world no. 2, ensured that he would reclaim that ranking, regardless of the outcome of his final showdown with Murray, the defending champion. Federer lost in the final, 5–7, 5–7.
A week later, Federer played in the 2010 Western & Southern Financial Group Masters in Cincinnati, Ohio, still seeded third behind Nadal and Djokovic, but competing as world no. 2 for the first time since Wimbledon. He received a bye in the first round, and then got another break when Uzbekistan second-round opponent Denis Istomin was forced to retire in the first set. He advanced to the quarterfinals in a walkover, when Philipp Kohlschreiber of Germany pulled out, citing a shoulder injury. He defeated frequent tour opponent and world no. 6 Nikolay Davydenko and advanced to the semifinals. He defeated Marcos Baghdatis and advanced to the finals. There he defeated Mardy Fish and successfully defended the title. Federer began his quest for a sixth U.S. Open title with an easy win over Brian Dabul. Federer next beat Andreas Beck. In the third round, Federer defeated Paul-Henri Mathieu. In the round of 16, Federer faced Roland Garros semifinalist Jürgen Melzer and won in straight sets. Then, in the quarterfinals, he faced Robin Söderling, who had recently beaten him in the quarterfinals of the 2010 French Open, and defeated him. He narrowly lost to Novak Djokovic in the semifinals after failing to convert two match points in the final set. As a result, Djokovic rose to no. 2 in the world and Federer fell to no. 3. By reaching the semifinals, Federer achieved his 20th match win in 2010 Grand Slams; this is the seventh consecutive year he has accomplished this feat, a record matched only by Ivan Lendl.

Asian swing

Federer competed at the ATP Masters 1000 Shanghai, where he was seeded third and had a bye in the first round. Federer defeated John Isner and Andreas Seppi to advance to the quarterfinals, where he defeated world no. 5 Robin Söderling. He avenged his last US open loss against Djokovic. However, in the final, Federer fell to Murray.

European indoor season

His next tournament was the Stockholm Open. He got a bye in the first round, defeated the American Taylor Dent in the next round, and defeated fellow Swiss Stanislas Wawrinka afterwards. Up next in the semifinals was Ivan Ljubičić, whom Federer beat in two sets. Federer won his 64th Tour-level title, tying with Pete Sampras for fourth place on the Open Era titles list, as he beat Florian Mayer in the final to win his first Stockholm crown.

He next participated at the 2010 Davidoff Swiss Indoors as the top seed. He defeated Djokovic the final, to win a record fourth title at the event. This was his 65th career title, placing him fourth in the all-time list, surpassing Pete Sampras' record of 64 career titles. At the BNP Paribas Masters, Federer reached the semifinals for the first time, where he lost to Gaël Monfils despite holding five match points.

At the 2010 ATP World Tour Finals, Federer was placed in Group B, along with Andy Murray, Robin Söderling, and David Ferrer. He defeated Ferrer in his first round-robin match. He then defeated Murray and defeated Söderling in his final round-robin match. These straight-set wins marked the first time Federer completed the round-robin stage without dropping a set. He was the winner of Group B and qualified for the semifinals. In the semifinals, he beat Novak Djokovic to advance to his sixth year-end championship final, where he faced his longtime rival Rafael Nadal. Federer retained his unbeaten record against Nadal at the ATP World Tour Finals by defeating the top seed in the final. Federer then had five season-ending championships to his name, tying Pete Sampras and Ivan Lendl for the most ever. Federer ended the year ranked world No. 2 and played Nadal in two charity matches, one in Zürich and one in Madrid. The proceeds benefited his own foundation, as well as Nadal's foundation. By the end of 2010 he widely became considered as the greatest player of all time.

Matches

Grand Slam performance

All matches

Singles

Exhibition matches

Doubles

Source (ATP)

Yearly records

Finals

Singles: 9 (5–4)

See also
Roger Federer career statistics

References

External links
  
 ATP tour profile

2010
Federer season
2010 in Swiss tennis
2010 in Swiss sport